Cycling was contested at the 1978 Asian Games in Huamark Velodrome, Bangkok, Thailand.

Medalists

Road

Track

Medal table

References

External links 
 Sprint results
 Time trial results
 Individual pursuit results
 Road race results
 Team time trial results

 
1978 Asian Games events
1978
Asian Games
1978 in road cycling
1978 in track cycling